Varpay, also rendered as Varpa or Varapa or Warpa, may refer to:
 Varpay-e Olya
 Varpay-e Sofla